Harrisonburg is an independent city in the Shenandoah Valley region of the Commonwealth of Virginia in the United States.  It is also the county seat of the surrounding Rockingham County, although the two are separate jurisdictions. At the 2020 census, the population was 51,814. The Bureau of Economic Analysis combines the city of Harrisonburg with Rockingham County for statistical purposes into the Harrisonburg, Virginia Metropolitan Statistical Area, which had an estimated population of 126,562 in 2011.

Harrisonburg is home to James Madison University (JMU), a public research university with an enrollment of over 20,000 students, and Eastern Mennonite University (EMU), a private, Mennonite-affiliated liberal arts university. Although the city has no historical association with President James Madison, JMU was nonetheless named in his honor as Madison College in 1938 and renamed as James Madison University in 1977. EMU largely owes its existence to the sizable Mennonite population in the Shenandoah Valley, to which many Pennsylvania Dutch settlers arrived beginning in the mid-18th century in search of rich, unsettled farmland.

The city has become a bastion of ethnic and linguistic diversity in recent years. Over 1,900 refugees have been settled in Harrisonburg since 2002. As of 2014, Hispanics or Latinos of any race make up 19% of the city's population. Harrisonburg City Public Schools (HCPS) students speak 55 languages in addition to English, with Spanish, Arabic, and Kurdish being the most common languages spoken.  Over one-third of HCPS students are English as a second language (ESL) learners. Language learning software company Rosetta Stone was founded in Harrisonburg in 1992, and the multilingual "Welcome Your Neighbors" yard sign originated in Harrisonburg in 2016.

History

The earliest documented English exploration of the area prior to settlement was the Knights of the Golden Horseshoe Expedition, led by Lt. Gov. Alexander Spotswood, who reached Elkton, and whose rangers continued and in 1716 likely passed through what is now Harrisonburg.

Harrisonburg, previously known as "Rocktown," was named for Thomas Harrison, a son of English settlers. In 1737, Harrison settled in the Shenandoah Valley, eventually laying claim to over  situated at the intersection of the Spotswood Trail and the main Native American road through the valley.

In 1779, Harrison deeded  of his land to the "public good" for the construction of a courthouse. In 1780, Harrison deeded an additional .
This is the area now known as "Historic Downtown Harrisonburg."

In 1849, trustees chartered a mayor–council form of government, although Harrisonburg was not officially incorporated as an independent city until 1916.  Today, a council–manager government administers Harrisonburg.

On June 6, 1862, an American Civil War skirmish took place at Good's Farm, Chestnut Ridge near Harrisonburg between the forces of the Union and the forces of the Confederacy at which the C.S. Army Brigadier General, Turner Ashby (1828–1862), was killed.

The city has expanded in size over the years.

On October 17, 2020, the city was the scene of a massive explosion and fire at a small shopping center  at Miller Circle in the South Main St. area.

Newtown

When the slaves of the Shenandoah Valley were freed in 1865, they set up near modern-day Harrisonburg a town called Newtown. This settlement was eventually annexed by the independent city of Harrisonburg some years later, probably around 1892. Today, the old city of Newtown is in the Northeast section of Harrisonburg and which is referred to as Downtown Harrisonburg. It remains the home of the majority of Harrisonburg's predominantly black churches, such as the First Baptist and Bethel AME. The modern Boys and Girls Club of Harrisonburg is located in the old Lucy Simms schoolhouse used for the black students in the days of segregation.

Project R4 and R16 
A large portion of this black neighborhood was dismantled in the 1960s when – in the name of urban renewal – the city government used federal redevelopment funds from the Housing Act of 1949 to force black families out of their homes and then bulldozed the neighborhood. This effort, called "Project R-4", focused on the city blocks east of Main, north of Gay, west of Broad, and south of Johnson. This area makes up 32.5 acres. "Project R-16" is a smaller tag on project which focused on the 7.5 acres south of Gay street.

According to Bob Sullivan, an intern working in the city planner's office in 1958, the city planner at the time, David Clark had to convince the city council that Harrisonburg even had slums. Newtown, a low socioeconomic status housing area, was declared a slum. Federal law mandated that the city needed to have a referendum on the issue before R4 could begin. The vote was close with 1,024 votes in favor and 978 against R4. Following the vote, the Harrisonburg Redevelopment and Housing Authority was established in 1955 to carry out the project. All of the members were white men. The project began and, due to eminent domain, the government could force the people of Newtown to sell their homes. They were offered rock bottom prices for their homes. Many people couldn't afford a new home and had to move into public housing projects and become dependent on the government. Other families left Harrisonburg. It is estimated between 93 and 200 families were displaced.

In addition to families, many of the businesses of Newtown that were bought out could not afford to reestablish themselves. Locals say many prominent black businesses like the Colonnade which served as a pool hall, dance hall, community center, and tearoom were unable to reopen. Kline's, a white-owned business, was actually one of the few businesses in the area that was able to reopen. The city later made $500,000 selling the seized property to redevelopers. Before the project, the area brought in $7000 in taxes annually. By 1976, The areas redeveloped in R4 and R16 were bringing in $45,000 in annual taxes. These profit gains led Lauren McKinney to regard the project as “one of only two ‘profitable’ redevelopment schemes in the state of Virginia.”

Cultural landmarks were also influenced by the projects. Although later rebuilt, The Old First Baptist Church of Harrisonburg was demolished. Newtown Cemetery, a Historic African American Cemetery, was also impacted. It appears no Burials were destroyed, however, the western boundary was paved over and several headstones now touch the street.

Infrastructure 

Major highways in Harrisonburg include Interstate 81, the main north–south highway in western Virginia and the Shenandoah Valley. Other significant roads serving the city include U.S. Route 11, U.S. Route 33, Virginia State Route 42, Virginia State Route 253 and Virginia State Route 280.

In early 2002, the Harrisonburg community discussed the possibility of creating a pedestrian mall downtown. Public meetings were held to discuss the merits and drawbacks of pursuing such a plan. Ultimately, the community decided to keep its Main Street open to traffic. From these discussions, however, a strong voice emerged from the community in support of downtown revitalization.

On July 1, 2003, Harrisonburg Downtown Renaissance was incorporated as a 501(c)(3) nonprofit organization with the mission of rejuvenating the downtown district.

In 2004, downtown was designated as the Harrisonburg Downtown Historic District on the National Register of Historic Places and a designated Virginia Main Street Community, with the neighboring Old Town Historic District residential community gaining historic district status in 2007. Several vacant buildings have been renovated and repurposed for new uses, such as the Hardesty-Higgins House and City Exchange, used for the Harrisonburg Tourist Center and high-end loft apartments, respectively.

In 2008, downtown Harrisonburg spent over $1 million in cosmetic and sidewalk infrastructure improvements (also called streetscaping and wayfinding projects). The City Council appropriated $500,000 for custom street signs to be used as "wayfinding signs" directing visitors to areas of interest around the city. Another $500,000 were used to upgrade street lighting, sidewalks, and landscaping along Main Street and Court Square.

In 2014, Downtown Harrisonburg was named a Great American Main Street by the National Main Street Association and downtown was designated the first culinary district in the commonwealth of Virginia.

Norfolk Southern also owns a small railyard in Harrisonburg. The Chesapeake and Western corridor from Elkton to Harrisonburg has very high volumes of grain and ethanol.
The railroad serves two major grain elevators inside the city limits. In May 2017 Norfolk Southern 51T derailed in Harrisonburg spilling corn into Blacks Run. No one was injured.

Shenandoah Valley Railroad interchanges with the NS on south side of Harrisonburg and with CSX and Buckingham Branch Railroad in North Staunton.

Harrisonburg Transit provides public transportation in Harrisonburg. Virginia Breeze provides intercity bus service between Blacksburg, Harrisonburg, and Washington, D.C.

Culture
 Harrisonburg has won several awards in recent years, including "#6 Favorite Town in America" by Travel + Leisure in 2016, the "#15 Best City to Raise an Outdoor Kid" by Backpacker in 2009, and the "#3 Happiest Mountain Town" by Blue Ridge Country Magazine in 2016.

Harrisonburg holds the title of "Virginia's first Culinary District" (awarded in 2014). The "Taste of Downtown" (TOD) week-long event takes place annually to showcase local breweries and restaurants. Often referred to as "Restaurant Week," the TOD event offers a chance for culinary businesses in downtown Harrisonburg to create specials, collaborations, and try out new menus.

The creative class of Harrisonburg has grown alongside the revitalization of the downtown district. The designation of "first Arts & Cultural District in Virginia" was awarded to Downtown Harrisonburg in 2001. Contributing to Harrisonburg's cultural capital are a collection of education and art centers, residencies, studios, and artist-facilitated businesses, programs, and collectives.

Some of these programs include:
 Larkin Arts, a community art center that opened in 2012 and has four symbiotic components: an art supply store, a fine arts gallery, a school with three classrooms, and five private studio spaces.
 Old Furnace Artist Residency (OFAR) and SLAG Mag: Artist residency and arts&culture quarterly zine focused on community engagement and social practice projects started in 2013.

 The Super Gr8 Film Festival, founded in 2009. The 2013 festival featured more than 50 locally produced films, and all of the films in the festival were shot using vintage cameras and Super 8 film.
 Arts Council of the Valley, including the Darrin-McHone Gallery and Court Square Theater, provides facilities and funding for various arts programs and projects.
 OASIS Fine Art and Craft, opened in 2000, is a cooperative gallery of over 35 local artists and artisans exhibiting and selling their work. It offers fine hand-crafted pottery, jewelry, fiber art, wood, metal, glass, wearable art, paintings, and photography.
 The Virginia Quilt Museum, established in 1995, is dedicated to preserving, celebrating, and nurturing Virginia's quilting heritage. It features a permanent collection of nearly 300 quilts, a Civil War Gallery, antique and toy sewing machines, and rotating exhibits from across the United States.

Historic sites

The Harrison House (formerly the Thomas Harrison House) 
The modern city of Harrisonburg grew up around this modest stone house, which until recently was thought to have been erected for Thomas Harrison ca. 1750. But new research and a dendrochronology study completed by James Madison University in 2018 has determined that it was built ca. 1790; Harrison died in 1785. Harrison laid out the town that was to bear his name on fifty acres of his holdings and was also instrumental in having Harrisonburg established as the Rockingham County seat in 1780. Prior to confirmation of the date of construction, it was believed that the first courts were held in this building, which is also associated with Bishop Francis Asbury, a pioneer leader of the Methodist Episcopal church, who often visited Harrison and conducted some of the county's first Methodist services. While the original Thomas Harrison house no longer exists, this building remains an early example of stone vernacular architecture in the Shenandoah Valley, and a contributing building in the Harrisonburg Downtown Historic District. Its window architraves are cut from solid walnut timbers. This house remained in the Harrison family until 1870, which is probably why it was long-thought to have been Thomas Harrison's.

Hardesty-Higgins House 
Home to Harrisonburg's first mayor Isaac Hardesty, the house bears his name and the name of the physician, Henry Higgins, who began construction in 1848. Isaac Hardesty was born in 1795 and became the city's first Mayor by charter on March 16, 1849, incorporating the town of Harrisonburg. Hardesty completed construction of the home by 1853 and lived in the house with his wife, Ann, and two children. He was a successful business man, apothecary, and merchant, and he served on the board of directors of the Valley Turnpike Company.

Isaac Hardesty supported the Union and moved from Harrisonburg during the early part of the Civil War. The Strayer sisters occupied the house and, during their stay, the sisters hosted Union General Nathaniel Banks. The house served as an inn after the war and was home to the Virginia Craftsman, makers of handcrafted furniture, from the 1920s to the 1980s.

Harrisonburg Downtown Historic District 
The approximately 100 acre Harrisonburg Downtown Historic District embraces the historic commercial and institutional core of the city. The principal axis of the district is Main Street, which runs approximately north–south through the district. Another principal thoroughfare is Liberty Street, which parallels Main Street. The principal cross axis is Market Street (US Highway 33), which intersects with Main Street on the east side of Court Square. The Romanesque Revival/Renaissance Revival 1896-97 Rockingham County Courthouse commands the square, and surrounding blocks arc densely developed with early twentieth century high-rise bank buildings and other commercial buildings from the 1870s through the 1950s. Most residential buildings dates to after the Civil War, when South Main Street developed as Harrisonburg's elite residential avenue. Notable houses from the period include Victorian/Queen Anne masterpieces such as Ute 1890 Joshua Wilton House and rarities such as the late 1880s Octagon House. Several fine Gothic Revival churches date to the early years of the twentieth century. Industrial buildings and warehouses date largely to the first half of the twentieth century and include the 1908 City Produce Exchange, a poultry shipping plant, and the late 1920s Maphis Chapman Co. gas storage tank factory. A complex of mid-twentieth century cinder block warehouses clusters near the 1913 Chesapeake Western Railway Station and the 1920-21 Rockingham Milling Co. roller mill on Chesapeake Avenue. Alter World War I automobile dealerships appeared in the downtown area. An outstanding example is the 1920 Rockingham Motor Co., an inspired Tudor Revival/Art Deco design. Architectural modernism achieved popularity in the 1940s and early 1950s at the end of the period of significance. Harrisonburg's downtown experienced a number of losses during the late twentieth century, but the recent rehabilitation of several key buildings demonstrates a growing commitment to the preservation of the district's historic character.

Other sites 
In addition to the Thomas Harrison House, Hardesty-Higgins House, Harrisonburg Downtown Historic District, and Old Town Historic District, the Anthony Hockman House, Rockingham County Courthouse, Lucy F. Simms School, Whitesel Brothers, and Joshua Wilton House are listed on the National Register of Historic Places.

Geography
The City of Harrisonburg comprises six watersheds, with Blacks Run being the primary watershed with 8.67 miles of stream and a drainage area of over 9000 acres. The city also drains into the Chesapeake Bay Watershed. Harrisonburg is in the western part of the Shenandoah Valley, a portion of the Valley and Ridge physiographic province. Generally, the area is a rolling upland with local relief between 100 and 300 feet.

Demographics

2020 census

Note: the US Census treats Hispanic/Latino as an ethnic category. This table excludes Latinos from the racial categories and assigns them to a separate category. Hispanics/Latinos can be of any race.

2010 census

As of the census of 2010, 48,914 people, 15,988 households, and 7,515 families resided in the city. The population density was 2,811.1/mi2  (1087.0/km). The 15,988 housing units averaged 918.9/mi2 (355.3/km). The racial makeup of the city was 78.4% White, 6.4% Black or African American, 0.3% Native American, 3.5% Asian, 0.1% Pacific Islander, 8.2% from other races, and 3.1% from two or more races. Hispanics or Latinos of any race were 15.7% of the population, up from 8.85% according to the census of 2000.

Of the 15,988 households, 22.1% had children under the age of 18 living with them, 32.7% were married couples living together, 10.1% had a female householder with no husband present, and 53.0% were not families. About 27.3% of all households were made up of individuals, and 17.4% had someone living alone who was 65 years of age or older. The average household size was 2.59, and the average family size was 3.06.

In the city, the population was distributed as 15.0% under the age of 18, 48.9% from 18 to 24, 21.2% from 25 to 44, 13.2% from 45 to 64, and 9.3% who were 65 years of age or older. The median age was 22.8 years. For every 100 females, there were 87.3 males.

The median income for a household in the city was $37,850, and for a family was $53,642. The per capita income for the city was $16,992.  About 11.5% of families and 31.8% of the population were below the poverty line, including 19.6% of those under age 18 and 9.5% of those age 65 or over.

Politics 

Like most of the Shenandoah Valley, Harrisonburg has traditionally been a Republican stronghold. It was one of the first areas of Virginia where old-line Southern Democrats began splitting their tickets. The city went Republican at every presidential election from 1944 to 2004. In 2008, however, Barack Obama carried the city by a margin of 16 percent—exceeding the margin by which George W. Bush carried it four years earlier. The city has gone Democratic in every presidential election since then, and has become one of the few Democratic mainstays in one of the more conservative parts of Virginia.

Government

Education

School systems 
Serving about 4,400 students (K–12), Harrisonburg City Public Schools comprises six elementary schools, two middle schools, and a high school. Eastern Mennonite School, a private school, serves grades K–12 with an enrollment of about 386 students.

Higher education 

 James Madison University (public)
 Eastern Mennonite University (private, Mennonite-affiliated)
 National College (private, for-profit)
 American National University (private, for-profit)

High schools
 Harrisonburg High School

Middle schools
 Skyline Middle School
 Thomas Harrison Middle School

Elementary schools
 Bluestone Elementary
 Smithland Elementary
 Spotswood Elementary
 Stone Spring Elementary
 Waterman Elementary
 W.H. Keister Elementary

Other schools 

 Elon W. Rhodes Early Learning Center
 Great Oak Academy

Technical schools 

 Massanutten Technical Center
 Massanutten Regional Governors School

Private schools
 Blue Ridge Christian School
 Eastern Mennonite School
 Redeemer Classical School (K–8)

Points of interest
 Hardesty-Higgins House Visitor Center
 Edith J. Carrier Arboretum
 Downtown Harrisonburg
 Harrisonburg's Old Post Office Mural (Now US Bankruptcy Court)
 Virginia Quilt Museum - located downtown and dedicated to preserving, celebrating, and nurturing Virginia's quilting heritage. The museum was established in 1995 and features a permanent collection of nearly 300 quilts, a Civil War Gallery, antique and toy sewing machines, and rotating exhibits from across the United States.
 Heritage Oaks Golf Course

Events
  The Alpine Loop Gran Fondo road-cycling event hosted by professional cyclist Jeremiah Bishop starts and finishes in downtown Harrisonburg.
 The annual Harrisonburg International Festival celebrates international foods, dance, music, and folk art.
 Valley Fourth - Downtown Harrisonburg's Fourth of July celebrations that bring in over 12,000 people.  The festival includes a morning run, food trucks, beer and music garden, kids' area, art market, craft and clothing vendors, and fireworks.
 Christmas/Holiday Parade- dates vary.
 Taste of Downtown - food event, yearly in March.
 MACROCK - an independent music conference held in the downtown area of Harrisonburg, Virginia the first weekend of April annually since 1997
 Skeleton Festival - This event blends aspects of Halloween and Dia de los Muertos in a big, community celebration. Activities kick off with trick-or-treating at downtown businesses and culminate with a fun, all-ages party at the Turner Pavilion & Park. The festival features kid, dog, and adult costume contests; face painting; fire dancing; food trucks; live music; a community ofrenda; video art; "trunk or treating"; wacky shacks, goober blobs and whisker biscuits. www.skeletonfestival.com
 Rocktown Beer & Music Festival- This event is very well attended each Spring. It features over 75 different beers and ciders. The band lineup changes each year and food is supplied by some of the local downtown restaurants. www.rocktownfestival.com

Sports
 Eastern Mennonite Royals  (NCAA Division III, Old Dominion Athletic Conference)
 2010 Division III Men's Basketball Elite 8 qualifiers
 2004 Women's Basketball Sweet 16 qualifiers
 Harrisonburg Turks (Valley Baseball League)
 James Madison Dukes (NCAA Division I, Football Bowl Subdivision, Sun Belt Conference)
 1994 NCAA Division I Field Hockey National Champions
 2004 NCAA Division I-AA Football National Champions
 2016 NCAA Division I Football Championship National Champions
 2018 NCAA Division I Women's Lacrosse National Champions

Climate
The climate in this area is characterized by hot, humid summers and generally cool to cold winters. Harrisonburg has a humid subtropical climate, Cfa on climate maps according to the Köppen climate classification, but has four clearly defined seasons that vary significantly, if not having brief changes from summer to winter.

Notable people

Born 
 David Avison, American photographer and physicist
Brian Bocock, former MLB player
 Pasco Bowman II, Judge of the U.S. Court of Appeals for the Eighth Circuit (1983–1999)
 Nelson Chittum, former MLB player
 James H. Cravens, U.S. Representative from Indiana (1841–1843)
 Clement Conger, White House Curator (1970–1990)
 Dell Curry, former NBA player; father of NBA players Stephen Curry and Seth Curry
 Page Dunlap, former LPGA Tour member and 1986 winner of the individual NCAA Division I Women's Golf Championship
 Dan Forest, 34th Lieutenant Governor of North Carolina (2013–2021)
 Alan Knicely, former MLB player
 Tom Lough, former modern pentathlete and competitor in the 1968 Summer Olympics
 Old Crow Medicine Show, Americana string band
 John Paul Jr., U.S. Representative from Virginia (1922-1923); U.S. Attorney for the Western District of Virginia (1929-1932); Judge for the Western District of Virginia (1932-1958), whose school desegregation rulings set off Massive Resistance by Virginia officials
 Thomas F. Riley, Brigadier general in the Marine Corps, later served as Orange County Supervisor 1974-1994
 Jeremiah Sullivan, Justice of the Indiana Supreme Court
 Kaitlyn Vincie, Fox NASCAR reporter and NASCAR Race Hub presenter
 Happy the Man, progressive rock band

Raised 
 Samuel B. Avis, U.S. Representative from West Virginia (1913–1915)
 John H. Gibbons, nuclear physicist; Director of the White House Office of Science and Technology Policy (1993–1998)
 William Conrad Gibbons, historian and Vietnam War expert
 Akeem Jordan, current NFL player
 Edgar Amos Love, co-founder of Omega Psi Phi fraternity
 John Otho Marsh Jr., U.S. Representative from Virginia (1963–1971); Secretary of the Army (1981–1989)
 Bill Mims, Justice of the Supreme Court of Virginia (2010–2022); former Attorney General of Virginia (2009–2010)
 Ralph Sampson, former NBA player
 Howard Stevens, former NFL player
 Maggie Stiefvater, bestselling young adult fiction author
 Josh Sundquist, paralympian, bestselling author, and motivational speaker
 Kristi Toliver, current WNBA player and NBA assistant coach
 Landon Turner, current NFL player
 John Wade, former NFL player

Resident 
 Jeremiah Bishop, cross-country mountain bike racer
 John T. "Judge" Harris, U.S. Representative from Virginia (1859–1861, 1871–1881)
 Daryl Irvine, former MLB player
 John R. Jones, brigadier general in Confederate States Army
 Gus Niarhos, former MLB player
 Mark Obenshain, Republican nominee in Virginia Attorney General Election of 2013; member of the Senate of Virginia (2004–present)
 Charles Triplett "Trip" O'Ferrall, U.S. Representative for Virginia (1883-1894), 42nd Governor of Virginia (1894–1898)
 John Birdsell Oren, U.S. Coast Guard Rear admiral
 Sofia Samatar, award-winning writer
 Howard Zehr, pioneer of restorative justice

See also
 Harrisonburg Department of Public Transportation
 National Register of Historic Places listings in Harrisonburg, Virginia
 Virginia Mennonite Conference

References and notes

External links

 City of Harrisonburg
 personal statement writing

 
County seats in Virginia
Cities in Virginia
Western Virginia
Rockingham County, Virginia